Thomas John Ashton, 3rd Baron Ashton of Hyde,  (19 November 1926 – 2 August 2008) was the eldest son of Thomas Ashton, 2nd Baron Ashton of Hyde and Marjorie Nell Brookes. He succeeded his father as Baron Ashton of Hyde on the latter's death on 21 March 1983.

Education and career
He attended Eton College, and New College, Oxford. He gained the rank of Major with the Royal Gloucestershire Hussars. He held the office of Justice of the Peace for Oxfordshire, 1965–1968. He was a Director of Barclays Bank, 1969–1987.

Family
He married Pauline Trewlove Brackenbury, daughter of Lt.-Col. Robert Henry Langton Brackenbury, on 18 May 1957, and has issue:
Thomas Henry Ashton, 4th Baron Ashton of Hyde (b. 1958)
Charlotte Trewlove Ashton (b. 1960), married Andrew D. Bartlett, 1987
Katharine Judith Ashton (b. 1962), married Douglas J. Lawson, 1987
John Edward Ashton (b. 1966)

References
Kidd, Charles, Williamson, David (editors). Debrett's Peerage and Baronetage (2003 edition). London: Pan Macmillan, 2003.
'ASHTON OF HYDE', Who's Who 2008, A & C Black, 2008; online edn, Oxford University Press, Dec 2007
thePeerage.com

External links
Death notice in The Times

1926 births
2008 deaths
3
People educated at Eton College
Alumni of New College, Oxford
British bankers
Royal Gloucestershire Hussars officers
Thomas

Ashton of Hyde